Persigar, an acronym for Persatuan Sepak Bola Indonesia Garut, is an Indonesian football club based in Garut, West Java. They currently compete in the Liga 3.

Squad (2021-22)

Notable players
  Johan Juansyah 
  Zaenal Arif
  Edi Hafid
  Elby Nugraha Rahardjo
  Ana Supriatna
  Rudi Geofani
  Nova Zaenal

Supporter 
GARMAN (Fullname: Garut Mania) is Supporter of Persigar Garut.

Kit Suppliers
 Vilour (2011-2010)

References

External links
    Liga-Indonesia.co.id
 

Football clubs in Indonesia
Football clubs in West Java
Association football clubs established in 1949
1949 establishments in Indonesia